Over the course of the Somali Civil War, there have been many revolutionary movements and militia groups run by competing rebel leaders which have held de facto control over vast areas within Somalia.

Prior to the fall of Siad Barre (through 1991)

Somali Salvation Democratic Front (SSDF) 
First Somali resistance group.

Leaders: Dr. Hassan Ali Mireh, Abdullahi Yusuf Ahmed, General Mohamed Abshir Musa, Mohammed Abshir Waldo (General Secretary)
Area of Operations: 1988: Mudug region in central Somalia and Nugaal and Bari regions in southern Somalia; 1991: northeast Somalia (Puntland)
Tribal Affiliation: Majerteen and Darood clans
Founded: 1978 by several army officers, it was the first of several opposition groups dedicated to ousting the authoritarian regime of Mohamed Siad Barre.

Took part in a 1982 Ethiopian border offensive against Somalia.

The SSDF also propped up and trained the SNM.  Both SSDF and SNM leaders met in Ethiopia’s capital in September 1987 to unite and devise a plan to topple Siad Barre’s regime but they failed to agree on a common strategy.

Somali National Front (SNF) 
The SNF was a political revolutionary movement and armed militia in Somalia. Initially made up of loyalists to former President of Somalia Siad Barre and the remnants of the Somali National Army forces after his ouster from office, the SNF's intent and goal was to recapture Mogadishu and reinstate Barre's regime. Later, under General Omar Hagi Masallah and General Ahmed Ali, the SNF united the Marehan with the other Darod clans led by General Mohammed Said Hersi "Morgan", and then attempted to conquer the region around Kismayo to form the autonomous district of Jubaland.

 Leaders: General Siad Barre, General Ahmed Ali, Mohammed Said Samatar "Gacaliye", Ahmed Sheikh Ali Ahmed "Burale", Dr. Ali Nur, General Mohammed Hashi Gaani, Col Barre Hiiraale, Gen Omar Hagi Massale, Col. Abdirizak Issak Bihi.
 Area of Operations: Southern and Central Somalia; occasional forays to outskirts of Mogadishu and neighboring borders.
 Tribal Affiliation: Marehan (Mareehaan)
 Founded: March 1991

Somali National Movement (SNM) 

Leaders: Ahmad Mahammad Culaid, Ahmad Ismaaiil Abdi, Abdulqaadir Kosar Abdi, Ahmed M. Mahamoud Silanyo, Abdirahman Ahmed Ali Tuur
Area of Operations: Northern Somali republic (Somaliland)
Tribal Affiliation: Isaaq
Founded: 1981

Isaaq tribe members had founded the movement in 1981 as emigres to London with the express purpose of overthrowing the Barre regime. They eventually moved to Addis Ababa, Ethiopia, and gained the support of the Ethiopian government.

On January 2, 1982, operating near Berbera, the group attacked Mandera Prison to free political prisoners while simultaneously raiding Cadaadle armory.

Between 1985 and 1987, the SNM conducted many attacks on government facilities and troops based out of camps in Ethiopia.

By 1988, the SNM moved out of their camps in Ethiopia and began operating in northern Somali republic, the area now known as Somaliland. They even temporarily occupied the provincial capitals of Burao and Hargeysa.

They captured government Toyota Land Cruisers turned them into technicals by mounting 12.7 mm and 14.5 mm machineguns, 106 mm recoilless rifles, and BM-21 rocket launchers. They also operated various antiaircraft guns, such as the ZU-23-2.

By 1991, they had taken control of Hargeysa, Berbera, Burao, and Erigavo. On May 18, 1991, they declared the Republic of Somaliland.

Somali Patriotic Movement (SPM) 
Leaders: Colonel Shugri Weyrah Kariye Colonel Bashir Bililiqo, Colonel Ahmed Omar Jess, General Aden Abdullahi Nur ('Gabyow'), General Mohammed Said Hersi "Morgan"
Area of Operations: southern Somalia
Tribal Affiliation: Ogaden (SPM 'Ogadeni') and Wardey (known as SPM 'Harti')
Founded: 1989

Begun by a group of disaffected Ogadeni officers.

A key accomplishment was the seizure of Balli-Dogle air base in the days prior to Barre's flight from Mogadishu.

Somali Democratic Alliance (SDA) 

 Leaders: Mohamed Farah Abdullahi, Mohamed Rashiid Sheekh also called sheekh malee, Zak Fergason, and Jamac Rabile(SDA)
 Area of Operations: Awdal, Somaliland
 Tribal Affiliation: Gadabursi
 Founded: 1989

Pro-Barre faction. Fought against other liberation movements during Barre's reign.

United Somali Congress (USC) 
Leaders: Dr. Omar M. Hassan, Hussein Ahmed Mohamed, Abdi Hilowle Hassan, Hassan Mohamud Moheddin, Hassan Omar Mohamed (Founders, 1989 Ali Mohamed Osoble (Ali Wardhiigley) And Dr. Ismael Jimaale) (Mogadishu section founder, 1989); General Mohamed Farrah Aidid, Ali Mahdi Mohamed, Mohamed Qanyare Afrah (November 1991)
Area of Operations: South Central Somalia
Tribal Affiliation: Hawiye (Habar Gidir, Xawaadle, Murusade and Abgaal clans)
Founded: February 1, 1989 in Rome

On January 26, 1991, the USC stormed the Presidential palace in Mogadishu, taking control of the capital and forcing Siad Barre into exile.

In November 1991, factionalism between Gen. Aidid and Ali Mahdi Mahammad caused a split in the USC. Mohamed Qanyare Afrah was chosen to be the Chairman of USC .

Somali Democratic Movement (SDM) 
Leaders:Maxamed Qanyare Afrah
Area of Operations: Mogadishu
Tribal Affiliation: Murusade 
Founded: April 1989

Al-Itihaad al-Islamiya (AIAI) 
 Leaders: Hassan Dahir Aweys, Hassan Abdullah Hersi al-Turki
 Area of Operations: Southwest (Ras Kamboni, Luuq)
 Religious Affiliations:Sunni Islam
 Founded: Late 1980s.

Southern Somali National Movement 
 Clan affiliation: Biimaal

United Somali Root (USR)
 Founded 1991, represents Somali indigenous groups, non-violence organization
 Leaders: Mohammed Husen, Ex-parliamentary Somali Transitional Federal Government; TFG, died 2010 in Mogadisho,
 and General Mohammed Mohammud Hayd Ex-cabinet of President Dr.Abdiqasiman, and parliamentary
 an advocate of Somali indigenous clans.
 Tribal Affiliation: Muse clan and madhiban  indigenous Somali clans.

Founded after the fall of Siad Barre through to the UN interventions (1991–1995)

Somaliland 

The Isaaq-dominated northern Somaliland region of Somalia declared its independence in 1991, but has not been recognized by any country or international organization as a sovereign nation.

Somali National Alliance (SNA) 
 Leaders: 1992-1996: Mohamed Farrah Aidid, Mohamed Nur Aliyou; 1996-2001: Hussein Mohamed Farah Aidid
 Area of Operations:Mogadishu
 Tribal affiliation: Habar Gidir, Ogaadeen, Raxanweyn, Sheekhaal, Duduble, Gugundhabe, Dir .
 Founded: June 1992 - 2004

Its constituents included Mohamed Aidid's breakaway United Somali Congress faction, the Somali Patriotic Movement, Southern Somali National Movement, and other southern factions. His son, Hussein Aidid, assumed leadership upon his death. The SNA became the core of the SRRC in 2001.

Somali National Front (SNF) 

 Leaders: General Siad Barre, General Mohammed Said Samatar, General Mohammed Hashi Gaani, General Ahmed Ali,'Gacaliye', General Omar Hagi Masallah, Dr. Ali Nur Mukhtar, Ahmed Sheikh Ali " Buraale ". Col. Abdirizak Isak Bihi, Mohamud Sayid.
 Area of Operations: Upper Jubba (Gedo), Middle and Lower Jubba regions; occasional forays to outskirts of Mogadishu
 Tribal Affiliation: Marehan (Mareehaan)
 Founded: March 1991

Loyalists to Siad Barre and Ahmed Ali, the remnants of his army forces founded the SNF militia after his ouster from office.

Their intent and goal was to recapture Mogadishu and reinstate the regime of Siad Barre, and to establish regional state in Gedo, Middle and Lower Jubba.

United Somali Front (USF) 
 Leaders: Abdurahman Dualeh Al;
 Area of Operations: Zeila, Somaliland
 Tribal Affiliation: Issa
 Founded: prior to 1991 as a small liberation movement. "New" USF founded Summer 1991

The original USF joined with the SNM in the creation of the Republic of Somaliland.

The Issa clan is a Somali clan that spreads across northwest Somaliland and the nation of Djibouti. The "new" USF especially sought to represent the interests of the Djibouti-based Iise.

Somali Africans Muke Organization (SAMO) 
(also called Somali Asal Muki Organization)

 Leaders: Mohamed Ramadan Arbow
 Area of Operations: ???
 Tribal Affiliation: Bantu
 Founded: 1993

Some of the tribes living the jubba and shabelle river banks

Somali National Democratic Union (SNDU) 
 Leaders: Ali Ismael Abdi and Abdullahi Azari
 Area of Operations: Galgadud, Mudug, Burtinle-Nugaal
 Tribal Affiliation: Awrtable and Lelkase Darood sub-clans
 Founded: 1991
Founding member of Puntland state, alongside the SSDF. 
 Museum : Museum is available at Mudug.

Somali National Union (SNU) 

 Leaders: Dr. Mohamed Ragis Mohamed
 Area of Operations:
 Tribal Affiliation: Reer Hamar; an Arabic, not ethnic Somali clan
 Founded: 1960s
 Ideology: Anti-Siad BarreReer Hamar interests

A political party that was active in the 1960s but was forced into dissolution during the Barre regime. It revived after his downfall.

United Somali Party (USP) 
 Leaders: Mohamed Abdi Hashi
 Area of Operations: Erigavo and Las Anod, Somaliland
 Tribal Affiliation: Dhulbahante, Warsangeli, Samaroon.
 Founded: 1957 - 1969 (original group); 1991

The "new" USP had no affiliation to the original group founded in the 1950s. The new group that bore their name were generally pro-Siad, but key participants in the Reconciliation Conference of the Elders at Borama in early 1993.

Those present at the 1993 Conference on National Reconciliation in Somalia

The 1993 Informal Preparatory Meeting on National Reconciliation and the Conference on National Reconciliation in Somalia saw the presence of no less than 15 separate factions, including the offshoot SNA branches of USC and SPM. It was a plethora of acronyms: SAMO, SDA, SDM, SNA, SNDU, SNF, SNU, SPM, SPM-(SNA), SSDF, SSNM-(SNA), USC-(SNA), USC, USF, USP. Aidid's four SNA-aligned factions comprised a powerful bloc.

The progressive tone of the proceedings was undercut by the actual lack of progress in the regions and on the streets of Mogadishu. In time, new factions emerged as the Somali Civil War entered a new phase: disintegration into independent and autonomous states.

Created after the departure of the UN Missions (1995–Present)

See also

References

Major Gideon S. Hall, Warlords of the Somali Civil War (1988-1995), Master's degree research report, Air Command and Staff College, United States Air Force, Maxwell Air Force Base, Alabama, 2015. Introductory overview.